Les Harmer (12 March 1921 – 24 May 2007) was a New Zealand cricket umpire. He stood in one ODI game in 1974.

See also
 List of One Day International cricket umpires

References

1921 births
2007 deaths
New Zealand One Day International cricket umpires
People from Greenwich
Sportspeople from London